The Heavy Airlift Wing (HAW) is an international military airlift organization based at Pápa Air Base, Hungary. The organization consists of several European states and the United States. It was officially activated on 27 July 2009 as part of the Strategic Airlift Capability (SAC) program, which purchased and operates three C-17 Globemaster III military transport aircraft that fly under the national markings of Hungary. The Heavy Airlift Wing is currently commanded by a Colonel from the Swedish Air Force, and is composed of up to 155 military personnel from the 12 participating states; Bulgaria, Estonia, Finland, Hungary, Lithuania, the Netherlands, Norway, Poland, Romania, Slovenia, Sweden, and the United States. Strategic Airlift Capability members send their personnel to work for the Heavy Airlift Wing on temporary or permanent positions.

The SAC members have requested missions in order to meet their obligations to employ/deploy/redeploy forces and equipment in support of national, UN, EU, NATO obligations, exercises, training and humanitarian relief, including the International Security Assistance Force 2009–2014, and the Resolute Support Mission, 2015– in Afghanistan. Operation Unified Protector in Libya, 2011. United Nations Multidimensional Integrated Stabilization Mission in Mali, 2013–. The EUFOR RCA, 2014–2015. The United Nations Multidimensional Integrated Stabilization Mission in the Central African Republic, 2015–. The wing has also conducted missions to provide logistical support to the investigation of the 2014 Malaysia Airlines MH17 crash in Ukraine. Significant humanitarian operations supported by the wing include earthquake relief in Haiti, 2010, flood relief in Pakistan, 2010, and hurricane relief to the island of Saint Martin, 2017.

The HAW is independent of any command by NATO, European Union, Partnership for Peace, United Nations, or any other organization that HAW member states belong to or support in the various missions. It is overseen by the SAC Steering Board, which manages its activities with support of NATO Airlift Management Programme Office (NAM PO). The SAC sets requirements and the NAM PO executes those requirements by sourcing the majority of the technical, logistic, and training support to the C-17 fleet from the United States and its military and Foreign Military Sales (FMS) programs, including C-17 maintenance which are contracted with Boeing.

See also
European Air Transport Command
European Air Group
European Personnel Recovery Centre

References

External links 

Strategic Airlift Capability
NATO Airlift Management Programme

Multinational air units and formations
Military units and formations established in 2009